Thomas Favors (December 29, 1920 – December 11, 2001), nicknamed "Monk", was an American Negro league outfielder in the 1940s.

A native of Atlanta, Georgia, Favors attended Clark College, and served in the US Army during World War II. He played for the Kansas City Monarchs in 1947. In his six recorded games, he posted five hits and three walks in 26 plate appearances. Favors died in Atlanta in 2001 at age 80.

References

External links
 and Baseball-Reference Black Baseball Stats and Seamheads

1920 births
2001 deaths
Kansas City Monarchs players
Baseball outfielders
Baseball players from Atlanta
United States Army personnel of World War II
African Americans in World War II
African-American United States Army personnel